The 45th Infantry Regiment "Reggio" is an active unit of the Italian Army based in Sassari in Sardinia. Founded in 1859 the regiment is named for the city of Reggio Emilia and part of the Italian army's infantry corps. The unit is operationally assigned to the Mechanized Brigade "Sassari".

History 
The regiment was raised on 1 July 1859 as 3rd Infantry Regiment of the Army of the United Provinces of Central Italy. On 8 August 1859 the 3rd and 4th infantry regiments formed the Brigade "Reggio", which on 25 March 1860 entered the Royal Sardinian Army three days after the Kingdom of Sardinia had annexed the United Provinces of Central Italy. Already before entering the Royal Sardinian Army the brigade's two infantry regiments had been renumbered on 30 December 1859 as 45th Infantry Regiment and 46th Infantry Regiment to establish their order of precedence in the Royal Sardinian Army. Together with its sister regiment the 45th Infantry Regiment participated in the Second and Third Italian War of Independence.

World War I 
The Brigade "Reggio" fought on the Italian front in World War I, for which its two regiments were each a awarded a Bronze Medal of Military Valour. On 31 October 1926 the Brigade "Reggio" assumed the name XXX Infantry Brigade and became the infantry component of the 30th Territorial Division of Cagliari, which was based on the island of Sardinia. In 1934 the division was renamed 30th Infantry Division "Sabauda".

World War II 

The division and its regiments spent World War II initially in Sardinia and until the were transferred to Sicily after the Armistice of Cassibile, where they were engaged primarily in airfield defence, policing and demining work. On 15 August 1946 the Internal Security Division "Sabauda" was downsized to brigade and, due to the result of the 1946 Italian institutional referendum, which had resulted in the deposition of the Royal House of Savoy, the brigade was named Infantry Brigade "Reggio". The Reggio was dissolved with most of its units on 1 Februar 1948, while the 45th Infantry Regiment "Reggio" based in Catania and the 46th Infantry Regiment "Reggio" based in Palermo joined the Infantry Division "Aosta". On 31 January 1959 the 46th Infantry Regiment "Reggio" was disbanded.

Cold War 
With the 1975 army reform the Italian Army abolished the regimental level and battalions came under direct command of the brigades and regional commands. Therefore, on 31 December 1975, the 152nd Infantry Regiment "Sassari" was disbanded and its training battalions came under direct command of the Sardinia Military Command. The regiments III Battalion in Macomer became a detachment of 151st Infantry Battalion "Sette Comuni". On 1 February 1977 the detachment was elevated to 45th Infantry (Recruits Training) Battalion "Arborea" and was given the regimental flag and traditions of the 45th Infantry Regiment "Reggio".

On 1st September 1993 the battalion was renamed 45th Infantry Regiment "Reggio" and became the training unit of the Mechanized Brigade "Sassari". The 45th Infantry Regiment "Reggio" was disbanded on 31 December 2002.

2022 Reactivation 
On 4 October 2022 the flag and traditions of the 45th Infantry Regiment "Reggio" were given to the Command and Tactical Supports Unit "Sassari" of the Mechanized Brigade "Sassari".

As of reactivation the unit is organized as follows:

  45th Command and Tactical Supports Unit "Reggio", in Sassari
 Command Company
 Signal Company

See also 
 Mechanized Brigade "Sassari"

External links
 Italian Army Website: 45th Command and Tactical Supports Unit "Reggio"

References

Infantry Regiments of Italy
Military units and formations established in 1859